Francesco Matano (born 14 September 1989) is an Italian comedian, television personality, YouTuber, and actor. He first gained notoriety in 2008 by publishing videos of phone pranks on YouTube. He is the first Italian YouTuber to reach one million subscribers.

He later participated in the television shows Le Iene, as an envoy and presenter, and Italia's Got Talent, as a judge.

Biography 
Frank Matano was born in Santa Maria Capua Vetere in 1989, from an Italian father and an American mother. He grew up in Carinola, but during his teenage years he studied languages in the United States, graduating from Cranston High School East, Rhode Island. Back in Italy, starting from 2007, at the age of 18, he comes to success on the web thanks to his YouTube channel consisting mainly of videos of telephone jokes and social experiments. For a short period he attended the University of Cassino and Southern Lazio, studying languages and without taking exams. Together with Willwoosh and ClioMakeUp, Matano is considered among the first and most famous Italian YouTuber.

In 2009 comes the first television experience, for the program Le Iene and the following year presents a program on Sky, dedicated to telephone jokes, called Sky Scherzando?. In 2011 he participated in the program Ti lascio una canzone by Antonella Clerici, conducting short interviews with the cast boys. In 2012 he participated in the Lost in Google webseries with the JackaL and in September of the same year participated in 2012 prima di morire on La3, together with Jacopo Morini, and then appeared in the video of the song "Ragazzo inadeguato" by Max Pezzali .

In 2013 he made his film debut by entering the cast of the film Fuga di cervelli, directed by Paolo Ruffini. Also in 2013, he created a second channel on YouTube dedicated to the world of videogames called "FRANK MATANO Games". In 2014 he is seen as an actor for another film, Tutto molto bello, also directed by Paolo Ruffini, released in cinemas from 9 October 2014. Also in 2014 Frank joins the Italian dubbers, dubbing the animated South Park series.
In 2015 he appeared on television as an envoy of Le Iene presentano: Scherzi a parte, planning jokes with victims Paolo Brosio and Paolo Ruffini. In the same year he returns to the cinema and takes part, together with Claudio Bisio, in the film What a Beautiful Surprise, directed by Alessandro Genovesi and in cinemas from 11 March 2015. In the same period, he also returns to television as a judge to Italia's got talent. In May 2015 he was consecrated "Revelation of the year" at the 2015 TV Direction Award.

In 2016 he presented Le Iene with Ilary Blasi and Giampaolo Morelli on Sunday. From 16 October 2016 Matano presented the midweek episode, always supporting the same colleagues. Towards the end of 2015 and the beginning of 2016, he dubbed Duke Donnolesi of Zootropolis, where he collaborates with Paolo Ruffini who dubbed the character of Yax.
From November 2017 together with Claudio Bisio presents The Comedians, broadcast on TV8.
In 2018 he starred in the film I'm Back, directed by Luca Miniero. Also in 2018, he was the protagonist of another film Tonno spiaggiato, directed by Matteo Martinez.
On 4 February 2018 he participates as a competitor along with Iva Zanicchi at the special edition of Guess My Age - Indovina l'età led by Enrico Papi on the Italian channel TV8. In 2021, he participated as a competitor in the Italian comedy show LOL - Chi ride è fuori.

Filmography

Films

Television

Music videos

References

External links
 

1989 births
Italian YouTubers
Living people
People from Santa Maria Capua Vetere